Liao Tianding (Hepburn: Ryō Tentei; 1883–1909) was a legendary Taiwanese Robin Hood figure who foiled oppressive rulers when Taiwan was under Japanese rule.

Liao died in 1909, trapped in a cave in present-day Bali District, New Taipei City, with an accomplice, Yang Lin, who had colluded with the police.

Liao Tianding was the subject of an extremely popular modern dance composition by Cloud Gate Dance Theater of Taiwan. He was also the inspiration for Ma Shui-Lung's Liao Tianding Orchestral Suite, which has been recorded by the Prague Symphony Orchestra.  in Bali was constructed to memorialize Liao and is usually referred to as Liao Tianding Temple.  Liao is also venerated at Miaosheng Temple in his hometown of Qingshui.  (A statue of Liao once served as a menshen (threshold guardian) at Wutianchan Shrine in New Taipei City’s Xindian District opposite Lee Shih-ke, a modern historical robber and murderer who is now revered by some as a folk hero in Taiwan.)

In popular culture

Films 

 1956 - Liao Tiending 廖添丁
 1962 - Youxia Hu Chienming 遊俠胡劍明. The script was based on Liao Tiending, but it was banned from broadcast unless the name is changed.
 1979 - Legendary Liao Tiending 傳奇人物廖添丁
 1987 - Taiwanese Hero Liao Tiending 台灣英雄廖添丁. Played by Ling Yun.
 1988 - Taiwan Hyoukyoku 台灣鏢局. The sequel to Taiwanese Hero Liao Tiending.
 1998 - Chivalrous Legend 俠盜正傳. Played by Jimmy Lin and Ashton Chen.

Television 

 1988 - Chinese Folk Tales 中國民間故事
 1991 - Legend of Liao Tiending 廖添丁傳奇
 1999 - Taiwan Liao Tiending 台灣廖添丁
 2002 - A Traditional Story of Taiwan: Liao Tiending 戲說台灣之少年廖添丁

Manga 

 1995 - Youxia King 俠王傳

Book 

 2017 - Chivalrous Liao Tiending 義俠廖添丁

Video Games 
 2004 - A Flash game called Shényǐng Wúzōng Liào Tiāndīng was released in 2004.
 2021 -  (廖添丁 - 稀代兇賊の最期) is a video game with Liao Tianding as its main character. It was released in November of 2021. It is a remake of the 2004 game in collaboration with the original creator.

References

Taiwan under Japanese rule
1883 births
1909 deaths
Taiwanese criminals
People from Taichung
Deified Taiwanese people
Taiwanese legends